Charles Henry Kalbfus  (a.k.a. Skinny) (December 28, 1864 – November 18, 1941), was a Major League Baseball outfielder who played in one game on April 18, 1884 for the Washington Nationals of the Union Association. He died on November 18, 1941 in Takoma Park, Maryland, United States.

References

External links

1864 births
1941 deaths
Major League Baseball outfielders
19th-century baseball players
Washington Nationals (UA) players
Baseball players from Washington, D.C.